Themes – Volume 5: March 91–September 92 is box set released by Simple Minds. The Themes series documents the band's developing sound through their classic 12″ single releases.

Track listing

Notes

References

2008 compilation albums
Simple Minds compilation albums
Virgin Records compilation albums